Wayne R. Meyer (1949 – 2009) is a former American politician and farmer from Idaho. Meyer was a Republican member of Idaho House of Representatives.

Early life 
On May 27, 1949, Meyer was born in Colfax, Washington. Meyer's parents were Richard and Helen Meyer.

Education 
In 1971, Meyer earned a Bachelor of Science degree in Agronomy from Washington State University.

Career 
Meyer was a farmer.

On November 8, 1994, Meyer won the election and became a Republican member of the Idaho House of Representatives for District 2 seat B. Meyer defeated Wally Wright with 62.2% of the votes. On November 5, 1996, as an incumbent, Meyer won the election and continued serving District 2 seat B. Meyer defeated Marc McGregor with 61.8% of the votes. On November 3, 1998, as an incumbent, Meyer won the election and continued serving District 2 seat B.

On November 5, 2002, Meyer won the election and became a Republican member of the Idaho House of Representatives from District 3 seat B. Meyer defeated Phil Harts with 68.3% of the votes.

On November 2, 2004, as an incumbent, Meyer lost the election for District 3 seat B. Meyer was defeated by Phil Hart with 91.0% of the votes. Meyer received 9.0% of the votes.

Personal life 
In 1970, Meyer married Karleen Penner. They have one child, Jamie Meyer. Meyer and his family live in Rathdrum, Idaho.

In 2005, Meyer was diagnosed with colo-rectal cancer. In 2006, Meyer completed chemotherapy.

On February 10, 2009, Meyer died from colon cancer in Idaho. Meyer was 59 years old.

References 

1949 births
2009 deaths
Republican Party members of the Idaho House of Representatives
People from Colfax, Washington
People from Rathdrum, Idaho
Washington State University alumni
20th-century American politicians